Amblyseius zaheri is a species of mite in the family Phytoseiidae.

References

zaheri
Articles created by Qbugbot
Animals described in 1986